Or is a Hebrew-language name, meaning "light, brilliance". It may be both a given name and a surname. Notable people with the name include:

Given name
 Or Eitan (born 1981), Israeli basketball player
 Or Goren (born 1956), Israeli basketball player
 Or Sasson (born 1990), Israeli Olympic judoka
 Or Tokayev (born 1979), Israeli Olympic rhythmic gymnast
 Or (monk) (died c. 390), Egyptian Christian monk

Surname
Amir Or, Israeli writer
 Israeli lawyer, Israeli Supreme Court Justice, namesake of the Or Commission
 Tomer Or (born 1978), Israeli Olympic fencer
 (born 1945), Israeli songwriter, recipient of Kinor David and ACUM Prize awards 
 (1904-1984), Israeli translator, recipient of the Tchernichovsky Prize (1951)

Hebrew-language surnames
Hebrew-language given names